Magic Mountain is a small theme park situated on the Sapphire Coast of New South Wales, near the town of Merimbula in Australia. The park attracts approximately 40,000 visitors per year and is a significant tourism drawcard for the region. During peak season, the park employs 25 staff from the surrounding area. Magic Mountain was opened on 26 November 1983 and has since expanded, providing visitors with a variety of educational and exciting experiences catering to both adults and children. The park does not charge for admission, however tickets are required to be purchased for individual rides or as unlimited passes. In keeping with Magic Mountain's family theme, children under 4 are able to ride suitable attractions for free with a paying adult.

In February 2018, the theme park was sold by Tunshow Pty. Ltd to Blyton Group.

Attractions

The park's main attractions include the Diamond Python Roller Coaster, added in 1994. The Mountain Slide is a popular  steel toboggan track which began operating in 1984. Two waterslides - The Black Hole and Doom Tube along with the Kiddie Splash Pool make up the park's water attractions.

Other attractions include Grand Prix Cars, Mini Golf, Magic Carpet slide, Toddler Town Cars, Triassic Park (an attraction featuring life-sized model dinosaurs in "natural habitats") and a  performing arts stage with seating for 2500 added in 2010 called the “Rocka House”.

In 2014 Magic Mountain expanded to include the Magic Mountain Tree Climb Challenge. This is a high ropes adventure course that features three courses and over 30 challenges. The Tree Climb challenge makes use of the natural bush settings at Magic Mountain and exists high in the trees.

Awards

In 2013 Magic Mountain was voted 9th in travel website TripAdvisor's Traveller's Choice awards for the top 10 amusement and water parks in the South Pacific region.

Since 2013 Magic Mountain has received Travelers' choice award in 2014 and 2016.

References

External links 

South Coast (New South Wales)
1983 establishments in Australia
Amusement parks in New South Wales